Anes Haurdić (born 1 March 1990) is a Bosnian-Herzegovinian football player who plays for Unis Vogošća.

Club career
After a career in the Czech First League and with several Bosnian Premier League clubs, Haurdić returned to football in 2020 after a career break and signed for ambitious Bosnian lower league side Unis Vogošća.

References

External links

1990 births
Living people
Footballers from Sarajevo
Association football midfielders
Bosnia and Herzegovina footballers
Bosnia and Herzegovina under-21 international footballers
FK Jablonec players
FK Sarajevo players
1. SC Znojmo players
FK Velež Mostar players
FK Sloboda Tuzla players
NK Čelik Zenica players
Czech First League players
Premier League of Bosnia and Herzegovina players
Bosnia and Herzegovina expatriate footballers
Expatriate footballers in the Czech Republic
Bosnia and Herzegovina expatriate sportspeople in the Czech Republic